The Rutshire Chronicles is a series of romantic novels by Jilly Cooper. The stories tell tales of mainly British upper-class families, as well as the show-jumping and polo crowd, in numerous different sexually charged scenarios, often laced with adultery, illegitimate children, scandal, and sometimes, even death. They are linked by several recurring characters, chiefly Rupert Campbell-Black, and are set in the fictional English county of Rutshire.

Some of these characters, namely Campbell-Black and numerous characters associated with him, also occur in Cooper's novel Pandora, although it is not part of the series. The Campbell-Blacks, Lloyd-Foxes, France-Lynches, and other families from the Rutshire Chronicles also appear in Wicked! (2006). The tales are set in chronological order; however, they are readable as stand-alone novels.

The Rutshire Chronicles 
 Riders (1986)
 Rivals (1988; also known as Players)
 Polo (1991)
 The Man Who Made Husbands Jealous (1993)
 Appassionata (1996)
 Score! (1999)
 Pandora (2002)
 Wicked! (2006)
 Jump! (2010)
 Mount! (2016)

Main/recurring characters
Rupert Campbell-Black
Agatha 'Taggie' Campbell-Black, née O'Hara
Marcus and Tabitha Campbell-Black
Basil Baddingham
Billy Lloyd-Foxe
Janie Lloyd-Foxe
Declan O'Hara
Ricky France-Lynch
Cameron Cook
Lysander Hawkley
Flora Seymour
Roberto Rannaldini
Dame Hermione Harefield
Cosmo Rannaldini
Anthea Belvedon
Dora Belvedon
Helen Hawkley, née McCauley (formerly Helen Campbell-Black, Gordon, Rannaldini)

References
Book review: Mount by Jilly Cooper by Lili Radloff http://www.w24.co.za (16 September 2016.)
Jilly Cooper's ninth 'bonkbuster' falls short http://www.stuff.co.nz (19 November 2016)
21 Things That Always Happen In Jilly Cooper Novels by Sarra Manning http://www.redonline.co.uk (6 September 2016)

Novel series
Novels by Jilly Cooper